The Allison T61 (known internally as the Allison 550-B1) was a  turboprop engine that was to power the 1959 version of the proposed Lockheed Super Hercules military and civil freight aircraft. The U.S. Air Force (USAF) had helped Allison fund the development of the T61 for four years. Lockheed had received orders from Pan American World Airways and Slick Airways for a total of 18 aircraft, but both orders were contingent on the military ordering the aircraft by September 30, 1959, around the date that the USAF's engine development contract expired. The development contract was extended temporarily to November 30, 1959, but the T61 development effort was canceled by January 1960, after USD$37.5 million had been put into the engine's development. Four T61 engines had run on the test stand at the time of cancellation.

It had a similar appearance to the Allison T56 but with a split compressor section instead of a single stage. The T61 improved on the power-to-weight ratio of the T56 by 30%.

Specifications

See also
 Allison T56
 Pratt & Whitney T34
 Rolls-Royce Tyne

References

Bibliography

External links
 

1950s turboprop engines
Allison aircraft engines